Best Island is an island in the southernmost part of Tasman Bay / Te Tai-o-Aorere, on the northern coast of New Zealand's South Island. It is connected to the South Island on the southwest and to Bell Island to the northeast by causeways. It is in the Richmond Ward of Tasman District.

The northeastern half of the island contains the Greenacres Golf Club. The middle of the island contains farms. The population is concentrated at the southwestern end. Legal access to properties is only from the sea, although private roads have been used for decades to give property-owners access. A plan for the district council to buy land for public road access failed in 2016.

The island was originally called Bests (or Best's) Island after a local family.

Demographics
Best Island contains almost the entire population of the area, with the population of Best Island and Bell Island being 93 in 2018.

Islands Tasman District had a population of 99 at the 2018 New Zealand census, an increase of 3 people (3.1%) since the 2013 census, and an increase of 6 people (6.5%) since the 2006 census. There were 45 households. There were 51 males and 48 females, giving a sex ratio of 1.06 males per female. The median age was 43.8 years (compared with 37.4 years nationally), with 24 people (24.2%) aged under 15 years, 9 (9.1%) aged 15 to 29, 57 (57.6%) aged 30 to 64, and 15 (15.2%) aged 65 or older.

Ethnicities were 93.9% European/Pākehā, and 3.0% Asian. The numbers of other ethnicities were not given specific numbers.

The proportion of people born overseas was 24.2%, compared with 27.1% nationally.

Although some people objected to giving their religion, 66.7% had no religion, 24.2% were Christian, 3.0% were Buddhist and 3.0% had other religions.

Of those at least 15 years old, 21 (28.0%) people had a bachelor or higher degree, and 12 (16.0%) people had no formal qualifications. The median income was $36,800, compared with $31,800 nationally. The employment status of those at least 15 was that 39 (52.0%) people were employed full-time, 18 (24.0%) were part-time, and 3 (4.0%) were unemployed.

References

Islands of the Tasman District
Populated places in the Tasman District
Populated places around Tasman Bay / Te Tai-o-Aorere